The 1945 UCLA Bruins football team was an American football team that represented the University of California, Los Angeles during the 1945 college football season.  In their first year under head coach Bert LaBrucherie, the Bruins compiled a 5–4 record (2–3 conference) and finished in fifth place in the Pacific Coast Conference.

Schedule

References

UCLA
UCLA Bruins football seasons
UCLA Bruins football
UCLA Bruins football